Podvis is a village in Municipality of Krivogaštani. Former name: Tursko. It used to be part of the former municipality of Žitoše.

Demographics
According to the 2002 census, the village had a total of 143 inhabitants. Ethnic groups in the village include:

Macedonians 143

References

Villages in Krivogaštani Municipality